The Copa del Generalísimo 1957 Final was the 55th final of the King's Cup. The final was played at Montjuic in Barcelona, on 16 June 1957, being won by CF Barcelona, who beat RCD Español 1–0.

Details

See also

 Derbi barceloní

References

1957
1956–57 in Spanish football
FC Barcelona matches
RCD Espanyol matches